Pian-e Olya (also Romanized as Pīān-e ‘Olyā; also known as Pīān-e Bālā) is a village in Pian Rural District, in the Central District of Izeh County, Khuzestan Province, Iran. At the 2006 census, its population was 121, in 25 families.

References 

Populated places in Izeh County